TrueMove H is a mobile telecommunication operator provided by Real Move Co., Ltd. and True Move H Universal Communication Co., Ltd. (formerly Real Future Co., Ltd.), subsidiaries of True Corporation. It is the second largest operator in Thailand.

Real Move is a mobile virtual network operator that uses CAT Telecom's 850 MHz network, acquired from Hutchison CAT Wireless MultiMedia Ltd (Hutch). True Move H uses 900 MHz, 1800 MHz and 2100 MHz, which licenses were granted by Thailand's National Broadcasting and Telecommunications Commission.

The predecessor brand "TrueMove" was operating on GSM 1800 MHz network when the license expired in September 2013.

True Move now provides 5G in Thailand.

History

Origin 

In 2000, Charoen Pokphand (CP) acquired Wireless Communication Services Co., Ltd. (WCS), a company with a license to operate mobile telecommunication service on 1800 MHz.

In 2001, WCS formed a partnership with a global telecom Orange, and WCS was later renamed to CP Orange. In 2002, it was renamed to TA Orange.

In 2004, Orange sold its stake in TA Orange to TelecomAsia for the nominal price of TH฿ 1.

TA Orange continued to be marketed as Orange until 2006.

TA Orange was rebranded to TrueMove in 2006 after TelecomAsia was rebranded to True Corporation.

Hutch acquisition 

In 2010, True Corporation acquired Hutch and its subsidiary from CAT Telecom. Real Move, a subsidiary of True, replaced Hutch as an operator of CAT's 850 MHz CDMA network.

TrueMove H was launched as a brand to market the reselling of 850 MHz from CAT Telecom.

TrueMove H launched its 4G service in a limited scale on 8 May 2013. It was the first 4G service in Thailand using LTE technology.

In 2012, True's subsidiary, Real Future (now True Move H), won the 2100 MHz license, together with its rivals AIS and Dtac.

In 2015, True Move H won the licenses for 900 MHz and 1800 MHz.

On November 22, 2021, Telenor and Charoen Pokphand Group, officially announced they have agreed to explore a USD 8.6 billion merger plan between Thailand’s second and third largest telecom operators (by subscribers), True Corporation (TRUE) and Total Access Communication (DTAC) – The proposed merger is subject to regulatory approvals. The merger was "acknowledged" by the regulator NBTC at a meeting on October 20, 2022. The newly merged company still retain the True Corporation name, which was founded on March 1, 2023 and it was listed on the Stock Exchange of Thailand under the stock ticker symbol TRUE on March 3, 2023.

Controversies

Issuing SIM card without checking ID 

In July 2016, a businessman from Ayutthaya lost TH฿ 986,700 after TrueMove H issued a new SIM card to a thief without checking an ID. Kasikorn paid the victim with full compensation, while TrueMove H agreed to give the victim a new Apple iPhone 6s Plus and one year of free calls.

References

External links 
 TrueMove H

Charoen Pokphand
True Corporation
Mobile phone companies of Thailand
Thai brands